Blake Malone (born March 23, 2001) is an American soccer player who currently plays for Colorado Rapids 2 in MLS Next Pro.

Career
Malone was part of the Seattle Sounders FC academy, and appeared for their USL affiliate side Seattle Sounders FC 2 during their 2018 season.

After leaving the Seattle Sounders academy, Malone began to play college soccer at the University of North Carolina at Chapel Hill in 2019.

In March 2021, Orange County SC loaned Malone to USL League One club Union Omaha for the 2021 season.

References

External links
 U.S. Soccer Development Academy bio (Seattle Sounders FC)
 

2001 births
Living people
American soccer players
Tacoma Defiance players
Orange County SC players
Union Omaha players
Colorado Rapids 2 players
Association football defenders
Soccer players from Washington (state)
USL Championship players
USL League One players
North Carolina Tar Heels men's soccer players
People from Mercer Island, Washington
Soccer players from Nevada
Soccer players from Nebraska
Sportspeople from King County, Washington
Sportspeople from Las Vegas
MLS Next Pro players